Martin Rieser is Professor of Digital Creativity in the Institute of Creative Technologies, in De Montfort University, Leicester.

Background
Joint research Professor between the Institute of Creative Technologies and the Faculty of Art and Design at De Montfort University, his track record as a researcher and practitioner in digital arts stretches back to the early 1980s. Originally a graduate of English literature and philosophy from Bristol University, he subsequently studied printmaking at Atelier 17 in Paris with Stanley William Hayter and then at Goldsmiths, where he also developed an abiding interest in photography. From such an already hybrid background he moved into computer crts, establishing the first postgraduate course in the discipline in London in 1982.

Research
His art practice in internet art and interactive narrative installations has been seen around the world including Milia in Cannes; Paris; The ICA London and in Germany, Montreal, Nagoya in Japan and Melbourne, Australia.

He has delivered papers on interactive narrative and exhibited at many major conferences in the field including Inter-Society for the Electronic Arts: Montreal 1995, Rotterdam 1996, Chicago 1997, Nagoya 2002, University of Oslo 2004, SIGGRAPH, 2005,  Banff Arts Centre 2005, Digital Matchmakers Trondheim 2005 Plan ICA 2005, NAI Rotterdam 2008, Intelligent Environments Seattle 2008, Locunet, University of Athens 2008, and at many other conference venues across the UK and Europe.

Installations and visual research
His interactive installations include Understanding Echo shown in Japan 2002, Hosts Bath Abbey 2006 and Secret Door Invideo Milan 2006, The Street RMIT Gallery Melbourne 2008. He is currently developing mobile artworks for Manchester and Vienna, and public installations for the new DMC in Leicester.

In 1988, he exhibited at the First International Society of Electronic Artists (FISEA) conference held in Utrecht. In 1990, created an interactive exhibition utilising giant digital panels and interactive sound installations with an accompanying multimedia program on the theme of the electronic forest. This was one of the first such installations of its type and prototyped the connection of such exhibitions to the internet. In 1990 he began experimenting with permanent digital ceramic printing for public art.

In 1992, he also directed the Media Myth and Mania section of the joint Watershed/Artec exhibition and CD publication From Silver to Silicon. The latter piece has been shown at many venues around the world including Milia in Cannes; Paris; ICA and the Photographer's Gallery, London and at ISEA Montreal. Other visual research projects included the direction of a 1995 collaboration involving five other artists (collectively known as Ship of Fools) using the subject of mythologies to explore the full range of narrative and visual interfaces in interactive media in a piece called Labyrinth. This work involved drama, digital image, virtual environments, and interactive video at F-Stop Gallery in Bath and as part of the Cheltenham Literary Festival. It has been previewed at a number of venues including the Oberhausen Short Film Festival in Germany and at ISEA in Montreal. His 2002 research project Triple Echo won an AHRB award and involves a three screen interactive video depicting a love triangle based on the Orpheus legends. Understanding Echo, 2002 was funded by the DA2. An interactive video drama, it was shown at the Cheltenham literary festival, Watershed Bristol and at ISEA2002 in Nagoya Japan.

He took AHRB research leave in 2004-5 creating a new, large–scale locative work for Bath Abbey called Hosts which uses mobile and positional technologies combined with interactive sound and video. In 2006 he was commissioned by Electric Pavilion to create Starshed, an interactive map of the uncanny for mobile and webmedia. Also in 2006 he exhibited Secret Room at Arthotel for Invideo Festival Milan. Current research includes Vienna Underground a locative media commission for the emobilArt European workshop and Riverains for the b.Tween Festival in Manchester. He is developing two further works for the new Digital Media Centre in Leicester: Secret Garden, a virtual reality opera co-authored with Andrew Hugill and The Street, an interactive video wall, featured in  autumn 2008 Melbourne in HEAT: The Art of Climate Change

Residencies/commissions
Watershed/Cambridge Darkroom residency which involved constructing a self-curating web site and multimedia piece called Screening the Virus, based around publicly submitted artwork on HIV/Aids related themes. This was later short listed for a Wellcome Trust Sci-Art award. He had an  Honorary Research Fellow Residency at La Trobe University Melbourne which led to his exhibiting The Street in   HEAT: The Art of Climate Change, an  RMIT Melbourne International Exhibition Commission in 2008. Other recent commissions include Riverains, a b.Tween Festival Locative commission for Exploding Narrative and  the 2008 Watershed Pervasive Media commission

He has published numerous essays and books on digital art including New Screen Media: Cinema/ Art/Narrative (BFI/ZKM, 2002), which combines a DVD of current research and practice in this area together with critical essays. And has recently edited The Mobile Audience, a book on locative technology and art due out this year from Rodopi.

He has also acted as consultant to bodies such as Cardiff Bay Arts Trust and the Photographer's Gallery London, Arkive in Bristol,  The Soros Media Institute in Prague and UIAH in Helsinki.

Curation
He has experience of curation and judging through number of other international exhibitions in electronic art, including The Electronic Eye European Digital Art at Watershed 1986, the first International survey exhibition of Digital Printmaking: The Electronic Print, Arnolfini in Bristol 1989. Arcade 2- 1997, Arcade 3 2000, He helped to make a successful lottery bid to fund a national digital arts initiative Imag@nation subsequently transformed into DA2: an arts initiative promoting digital art practice nationally, and internationally.

Publications
Rieser, Martin, and Middleton, Tim 2008 The Crow Road  SOLSTICE Conference, Edge Hill University 
Conference proceedings
Rieser, Martin, and Randell, Cliff  2008 Hosts, Intelligent Environments Seattle Conference proceedings
Rieser, Martin, 2008 Mobile, Pervasive and Locative Media Art and the reinvention of Place  Future of Creative Technologies Magazine IOCT, De Montfort University
Rieser, Martin (Editor /Author) The Mobile Audience (Book and Website) on Mobile media art, Rodopi  (Pending 2008) 
Rieser, Martin, Rediscovering spatial narrative for locative media, at Porus City, Urban Interface Conference, Oslo, 2007
Rieser, Martin, Mobile Audience at Fuzzy Interference: Digitising the Environment: Lovebytes Conference Panel Sheffield 2006
Rieser, Martin, Hosts Trondheim Matchmakers  2005
Rieser, Martin, The Poetics of Interactivity: The Uncertainty Principle at Interactivity of Digital Texts Conference, University Of Meunster, Germany 2005
Rieser, Martin, Locative Media and Spatial Narratives, Presentation and paper at Consciousness Reframed: Altered States Conference, University of Plymouth 2005
Rieser, Martin, Networked Performance: How Does Art Affect Technology and Vice Versa? Paper and Panel Presentation, Siggraph Los Angeles, USA,  2005
Rieser, Martin, Narratives for the 21st Century, Poster and Paper at  Refresh: New Media Histories, Banff Centre, Canada, 2005
Rieser, Martin, Mobile Mapping in Gibbons, Joan and Winwood, Kaye (Eds), Hothaus Papers: perspectives and paradigms in media arts, Article Press and VIVID 2006
Rieser, Martin, From Gallery to Street in Mealing, Stuart (Editor). Computers and Art. Intellect 2nd edition 2003
Rieser, Martin and Zapp, Andrea (Eds), New Screen Media: Cinema, Art, Narrative, BFI/ZKM 2002

Exhibitions
2001 Understanding Echo Watershed Media Centre Bristol
2002 Understanding Echo, ISEA20002, Nagoya, Japan
2005 The Visitors Hotel, Ashley Court Hotel, Bristol
2005 Starshed, Electric Pavilion, Watershed Bristol
2006 Hosts, Bath Abbey
2006 Secret Door ArtHotel, Invideo Milan
2007 Roamedia, La Trobe University Melbourne
2008 The Street HEAT: The Art of Climate Change RMIT Gallery Melbourne

Conference presentations
1993 The Digital Mural ISEA 1993 Minneapolis
1995 Interactive Narrative also chair of panel on Interactive Narrative ISEA95 Montreal 
1996 Interactive Narrative: Educating the Authors ISEA96 Rotterdam
1997 Printmaking Panel- Digital Prints CADE 1997
1997 Hypermedia Forum Oberhausen Short Film Festival
1997 Public Art, Architecture and interactivity ISEA 1997 Chicago
1999 Cinema and Digital Convergence Digital Convergence, Edinburgh, EU Media 2 Workshop
1999 Do Artists and Engineers Make good Love Objects? Creativity and Cognition, Panel on Art / Science collaboration
2000 Scripting and Visualisation  Paper on cinema and digital aesthetics EU Media 2 Workshop for New Media
2001 The Poetics of Interactivity Circus conference, Glasgow University
2002 The Poetics of Interactivity Incubation Conference, Trace, Nottingham Trent University
2003 The Spatialised Narrative, Multimedia Histories, University of Exeter
2004 Vivid/UCE Space Seminar-Chair and paper
2004 Oslo University Intermedia Conference: Frames
2005 Interactive Texts University of Muenster, Germany	
2005 Manchester Metropolitan University Seminar presentation
2005 Trondheim Matchmakers Presentation
2005 Coventry University Presentation
2006 Lovebytes- Fuzzy Interference Panel
2007 Urban Screens Oslo 
2007 Kingston University
2008 Mobile City NIA Rotterdam
2008 Keynote, Locunet Symposium University of Athens
2008 Solstice Conference UK
2008 Interactive Environments Seattle

Prizes, shortlistings and commissions
2003 Clark's Digital Bursary (shortlist) 
2003 Trace Online Writing Residency 2003 (shortlist)
2005 Electric Pavilion Commission for Starshed project
2006 Hosts (Arts Council Award)
2006 Roper Rhodes for Hosts (funding award)
2006 Secret Door Invideo Milan
2008 Exploding Narrative B.Tween Festival (Shortlist)
2008 Watershed Pervasive Media Locative commission 
2008 HEAT RMIT Melbourne International Exhibition Commission
2008 Media Sandbox (Award)

External links
Martin Rieser's Personal Website

British installation artists
British art teachers
Academics of De Montfort University